This is a list of extant valid species and subspecies of the formicine genus Camponotus (carpenter ants).  There are over 1,000 species in this genus.

A

 Camponotus aberrans Mayr, 1895
 Camponotus abdominalis (Fabricius, 1804) 
 Camponotus abjectus Santschi, 1937 
 Camponotus abrahami Forel, 1913 
 Camponotus abscisus Roger, 1863
 Camponotus abunanus Mann, 1916
 Camponotus acutirostris Wheeler, 1910
 Camponotus acvapimensis Mayr, 1862
 Camponotus adami Forel, 1910
 Camponotus adenensis Emery, 1893
 Camponotus aegaeus Emery, 1915
 Camponotus aegyptiacus Emery, 1915
 Camponotus aeneopilosus Mayr, 1862
 Camponotus aequatorialis Roger, 1863
 Camponotus aequitas Santschi, 1920
 Camponotus aethiops (Latreille, 1798)
 Camponotus afflatus Viehmeyer, 1925
 Camponotus ager (Smith F., 1858)
 Camponotus agonius Santschi, 1915
 Camponotus aguilerai Kusnezov, 1952
 Camponotus alacer Forel, 1912
 Camponotus alamaina Rakotonirina, Csösz & Fisher, 2016
 Camponotus albicoxis Forel, 1899
 Camponotus albipes Emery, 1893
 Camponotus albistramineus Wheeler, 1936
 Camponotus albivillosus Zhou, 2001
 Camponotus alboannulatus Mayr, 1887
 Camponotus albocinctus (Ashmead, 1905)
 Camponotus albosparsus Bingham, 1903
 Camponotus alii Forel, 1890
 Camponotus altivagans Wheeler, 1936
 Camponotus amamianus Terayama, 1991
 Camponotus amaurus Espadaler, 1997
 Camponotus ambon Zhang, 1989
 Camponotus americanus Mayr, 1862
 Camponotus amoris Forel, 1904
 Camponotus amphidus Santschi, 1926
 †Camponotus ampullosus Zhang, 1989
 Camponotus andrei Forel, 1885
 Camponotus andrewsi Donisthorpe, 1936
 Camponotus andrius Dalla Torre, 1893
 Camponotus androy Rakotonirina, Csösz & Fisher, 2016
 Camponotus anguliceps Stitz, 1938
 Camponotus angusticeps Emery, 1886
 Camponotus angusticollis (Jerdon, 1851)
 Camponotus anningensis Wu and Wang, 1989
 Camponotus annulatus Karavaiev, 1929
 Camponotus anthrax Wheeler, 1911
 Camponotus apicalis (Mann, 1916)
 Camponotus apostolus Forel, 1901
 Camponotus arabicus Collingwood, 1985
 Camponotus arboreus (Smith F., 1858)
 Camponotus arcuatus Mayr, 1876
 Camponotus arenatus Shattuck and McArthur, 2002
 Camponotus argus Santschi, 1935
 Camponotus arhuacus Forel, 1902
 Camponotus armeniacus Arnol’di, 1967
 Camponotus arminius Forel, 1910
 Camponotus armstrongi McAreavey, 1949
 Camponotus arnoldinus Forel, 1914
 Camponotus arrogans (Smith F., 1858)
 Camponotus asli Dumpert, 1989
 Camponotus atlantis Forel, 1890
 Camponotus atriceps (Smith F., 1858)
 Camponotus atriscapus Santschi, 1926
 Camponotus atrox Emery, 1925
 Camponotus augustei Wheeler and Mann, 1914
 Camponotus auratiacus Zhou, 2001
 Camponotus aureopilus Viehmeyer, 1914
 Camponotus auricomus Roger, 1862
 Camponotus auriculatus Mayr, 1897
 Camponotus auriventris Emery, 1889
 Camponotus aurocinctus (Smith F., 1858)
 Camponotus aurofasciatus Santschi, 1915
 Camponotus auropubens Forel, 1894
 Camponotus aurosus Roger, 1863
 Camponotus autrani Forel, 1886
 Camponotus avius Santschi, 1926

B

 Camponotus babau Bolton, 1995
 Camponotus bactrianus Pisarski, 1967
 Camponotus bakeri Wheeler, 1904
 Camponotus bakhtiariensis Salata, Khalili-Moghadam & Borowiec, 2020
 Camponotus baldaccii Emery, 1908
 Camponotus balzani Emery, 1894
 Camponotus banghaasi Emery, 1903
 Camponotus barbaricus Emery, 1905
 Camponotus barbarossa Emery, 1920
 Camponotus barbatus Roger, 1863
 Camponotus barbosus Baroni Urbani, 1972
 Camponotus baronii Alayo & Zayas Montero, 1977
 Camponotus basuto Arnold, 1958
 Camponotus batesii Forel, 1895
 Camponotus bayeri Forel, 1913
 Camponotus baynei Arnold, 1922
 Camponotus beccarii Emery, 1887
 Camponotus bedoti Emery, 1893
 Camponotus beebei Wheeler, 1918
 Camponotus belligerus Santschi, 1920
 Camponotus bellus Forel, 1908
 Camponotus belumensis Dumpert, 1995
 Camponotus benguelensis Santschi, 1911
 Camponotus bermudezi Aguayo, 1932
 Camponotus berthoudi Forel, 1879
 Camponotus bertolonii Emery, 1895
 Camponotus bevohitra Rakotonirina, Csösz & Fisher, 2016
 Camponotus bianconii Emery, 1895
 Camponotus bidens Mayr, 1870
 Camponotus bifossus Santschi, 1917
 Camponotus bigenus Santschi, 1919
 Camponotus binghamii Forel, 1894
 Camponotus biolleyi Forel, 1902
 Camponotus bishamon Terayama, 1999
 Camponotus bispinosus Mayr, 1870
 Camponotus biturberculatus Andre, 1889
 Camponotus blandus (Smith F., 1858)
 Camponotus bocki Forel, 1907
 Camponotus boghossiani Forel, 1911
 Camponotus bonariensis Mayr, 1868
 Camponotus borellii Emery, 1894
 Camponotus bottegoi Emery, 1895
 Camponotus branneri (Mann, 1916)
 Camponotus brasiliensis Mayr, 1862
 Camponotus braunsi Mayr, 1895
 Camponotus brettesi Forel, 1899
 Camponotus brevicollis Stitz, 1916
 Camponotus brevis Forel, 1899
 Camponotus breviscapus Zhou, 2001
 Camponotus brevisetosus Forel, 1910
 Camponotus britteni Donisthorpe, 1931
 Camponotus brookei Forel, 1914
 Camponotus bruchi Forel, 1912
 Camponotus brullei (Smith F., 1858)
 Camponotus bruneiensis Viehmeyer, 1922
 Camponotus brunni Forel, 1901
 Camponotus brutus Forel, 1886
 Camponotus buchholzi Mayr, 1902
 Camponotus buchneri Forel, 1886
 Camponotus buddhae Forel, 1892
 Camponotus bugnioni Forel, 1899
 Camponotus burgeoni Santschi, 1926
 Camponotus burtoni Mann, 1916
 Camponotus butteli Forel, 1905
 Camponotus buttikeri Arnold, 1958

C

 Camponotus cacicus Emery, 1903
 Camponotus caesar Forel, 1886
 Camponotus caffer Emery, 1895
 Camponotus callistus Emery, 1911
 Camponotus callmorphus Stitz, 1923
 Camponotus cambouei Forel, 1891
 Camponotus camelinus (Smith F., 1857)
 Camponotus cameranoi Emery, 1894
 Camponotus cameratus Viehmeyer, 1925
 Camponotus cameroni Forel, 1892
 Camponotus candiotes Emery, 1894
 Camponotus canescens Mayr, 1870
 Camponotus capito Mayr, 1876
 Camponotus capperi Forel, 1899
 Camponotus caracalla Forel, 1912
 Camponotus carbo Emery, 1877
 Camponotus carbonarius (Latreille, 1802)
 Camponotus carin Emery, 1889
 Camponotus caryae (Fitch, 1855)
 Camponotus casicus Santschi, 1920
 Camponotus castaneus (Latreille, 1802)
 Camponotus castanicola Donisthorpe, 1943
 Camponotus catalanus Emery, 1924
 Camponotus cecconii Emery, 1908
 Camponotus ceriseipes Clark, 1938
 Camponotus cervicalis Roger, 1863
 Camponotus chalceoides Clark, 1938
 Camponotus chalceus Crawley, 1915
 Camponotus championi Forel, 1899
 Camponotus chapini Wheeler, W. M., 1922
 Camponotus chartifex (Smith F., 1860)
 Camponotus chazaliei Forel, 1899
 Camponotus cheesmanae Donisthorpe, 1932
 Camponotus chilensis (Spinola, 1851)
 Camponotus chloroticus Emery, 1897
 Camponotus chongqingensis Wu and Wang, 1989
 Camponotus christi Forel, 1886
 Camponotus christophei Wheeler, and Mann, 1914
 Camponotus christopherseni Forel, 1912
 Camponotus chromaiodes Bolton, 1995
 Camponotus chrysurus Gerstacker, 1871
 Camponotus cilicicus Emery, 1908
 Camponotus cillae Forel, 1912
 Camponotus cinctellus (Gerstacker, 1859)
 Camponotus cinerascens (Fabricius, 1787)
 Camponotus cinereus Mayr, 1876
 Camponotus cingulatus Mayr, 1862
 Camponotus circularis Mayr, 1870
 Camponotus circumspectus (Smith F., 1861)
 Camponotus clarior Forel, 1902
 Camponotus claripes Mayr, 1876
 Camponotus clarithorax Creighton, 1950
 Camponotus claviscapus Forel, 1899
 Camponotus cleobulus Santschi, 1919
 Camponotus clypeatus Mayr, 1866
 †Camponotus cockerelli (Donisthorpe, 1920)
 Camponotus cocosensis Wheeler, 1919
 Camponotus cognatocompressus Forel, 1904
 †Camponotus compactus Förster, 1891
 Camponotus compositor Santschi, 1922
 Camponotus compressiscapus Andre, 1889
 Camponotus compressus (Fabricius, 1787)
 Camponotus concavus Kim and Kim, 1994
 Camponotus concolor Forel, 1891
 Camponotus confluens Forel, 1913
 Camponotus confucii Forel, 1894
 Camponotus congolensis Emery, 1899
 Camponotus coniceps Santschi, 1926
 Camponotus conradti Forel, 1914
 Camponotus consanguineus (Smith F., 1861)
 Camponotus consectator (Smith F., 1858)
 Camponotus consobrinus (Erichson, 1842)
 Camponotus conspicuus (Smith F., 1858)
 Camponotus constructor Forel, 1899
 Camponotus contractus Mayr, 1872
 Camponotus conulus Mayr, 1870
 Camponotus convexiclypeus MacKay, 1997
 Camponotus coptobregma Kempf, 1968
 Camponotus cordiceps Santschi, 1939
 Camponotus cordincola Wheeler, 1934
 Camponotus coriolanus Forel, 1912
 Camponotus corniculatus Wheeler, 1934
 Camponotus cornis Wang and Wu, 1994
 Camponotus coruscus (Smith F., 1862)
 Camponotus cosmicus (Smith F., 1858)
 Camponotus cowlei Froggatt, 1896
 Camponotus coxalis (Smith F., 1859)
 Camponotus crassicornis Emery, 1920
 Camponotus crassisquamis Forel, 1902
 Camponotus crassus Mayr, 1862
 Camponotus crawleyi Emery, 1920
 Camponotus crenatus Mayr, 1876
 Camponotus crepusculi Arnold, 1922
 Camponotus cressoni Andre, 1887
 Camponotus criniticeps Menozzi, 1939
 †Camponotus crozei Riou, 1999
 Camponotus crucheti Santschi, 1911
 Camponotus cruentatus (Latreille, 1802)
 Camponotus cuauhtemoc Snelling, 1988
 Camponotus cubangensis Forel, 1901
 Camponotus cuneidorsus Emery, 1920
 Camponotus cuneiscapus Forel, 1910
 †Camponotus curviansatus Zhang, 1989
 Camponotus curviscapus Emery, 1896
 Camponotus cyrtomyrmodes Donisthorpe, 1941

D

 Camponotus daitoensis Terayama, 1999
 Camponotus dalmasi Forel, 1899
 Camponotus dalmaticus (Nylander, 1849)
 Camponotus darlingtoni Wheeler, 1934
 Camponotus darwinii Forel, 1886
 Camponotus debellator Santschi, 1926
 Camponotus decipiens Emery, 1893
 Camponotus declivus Santschi, 1922
 Camponotus dedalus Forel, 1911
 Camponotus deletangi Santschi, 1920
 Camponotus depressiceps Forel, 1879
 Camponotus depressus Mayr, 1866
 Camponotus desantii Santschi, 1915
 Camponotus descarpentriesi Santschi, 1926
 Camponotus detritus Emery, 1886
 Camponotus devestivus Wheeler, 1928
 Camponotus dewitzii Forel, 1886
 Camponotus dicksoni Arnold, 1948
 Camponotus difformis Stitz, 1938
 Camponotus dimorphus Emery, 1894
 Camponotus diplopunctatus Emery, 1915
 Camponotus discolor (Buckley, 1866)
 Camponotus discors Forel, 1902
 Camponotus distinguendus (Spinola, 1851)
 Camponotus divergens Mayr, 1887
 Camponotus diversipalpus Santschi, 1922
 Camponotus dolabratus Menozzi, 1927
 Camponotus dolendus Forel, 1892
 Camponotus dolichoderoides Forel, 1911
 Camponotus donisthorpei Emery, 1920
 Camponotus donnellani Shattuck and McArthur, 2002
 Camponotus dorycus (Smith F., 1860)
 Camponotus dracocephalus Stitz, 1938
 Camponotus dromas Santschi, 1919
 Camponotus dromedarius Forel, 1891
 Camponotus druryi Forel, 1886
 Camponotus dryandrae McArthur and Adams, 1996
 Camponotus dufouri Forel, 1891
 Camponotus dumetorum Wheeler., 1910

E

 Camponotus eastwoodi McArthur and Adams, 1996
 Camponotus echinoploides Forel, 1891
 Camponotus edmondi Andre, 1887
 Camponotus egregius (Smith F., 1858)
 Camponotus elegans Forel, 1902
 Camponotus elevatus Forel, 1899
 Camponotus ellioti Forel, 1891
 Camponotus emarginatus Emery, 1886
 Camponotus emeryodicatus Forel, 1901
 Camponotus empedocles Emery, 1920
 Camponotus enigmaticus MacKay, MacKay, & MacKay, 2004
 Camponotus eperiamorum Clouse, 2007
 Camponotus ephippiatus Viehmeyer, 1916
 Camponotus ephippium (Smith F., 1858)
 Camponotus equus Stitz, 1932
 Camponotus eremicus Wheeler, 1915
 Camponotus erigens Forel, 1894
 Camponotus erinaceus Gerstacker, 1871
 Camponotus errabundus Arnold, 1949
 Camponotus erythrocephalus Clouse, 2007
 Camponotus erythrostoma Emery, 1920
 Camponotus esau Forel, 1915
 Camponotus essigi Smith, 1923
 Camponotus ethicus Forel, 1897
 Camponotus etiolipes Bolton, 1995
 Camponotus eugeniae Forel, 1879
 Camponotus eurynotus Forel, 1907
 Camponotus evae Forel, 1910
 Camponotus evansi Crawley, 1920
 Camponotus excisus Mayr, 1870
 Camponotus exiguoguttatus Forel, 1886
 Camponotus exsectus Emery, 1900
 Camponotus extensus Mayr, 1876
 Camponotus ezotus Bolton, 1995

F
[[File:Camponotus floridanus worker on plant.jpg|thumb|right|upright|Camponotus floridanus']]

 Camponotus fabricator (Smith F., 1858)
 Camponotus falco Forel, 1902
 Camponotus fallatus Bolton, 1995
 Camponotus fallax (Nylander, 1856)
 Camponotus fasciatellus Dalla Torre, 1892
 Camponotus fasciatus (Mayr, 1867)
 Camponotus fastigatus Roger, 1863
 Camponotus favorabilis Santschi, 1919
 Camponotus fayfaensis Collingwood, 1985
 Camponotus fedtschenkoi Mayr, 1877
 Camponotus fellah Dalla Torre, 1893
 Camponotus femoratus (Fabricius, 1804)
 Camponotus fergusoni McArthur, 2003
 Camponotus ferreri Forel, 1913
 Camponotus fervidus Donisthorpe, 1943
 Camponotus festai Emery, 1894
 Camponotus festinatus (Buckley, 1866)
 Camponotus festinus (Smith F., 1857)
 Camponotus fiebrigi Forel, 1906
 Camponotus fieldeae Forel, 1902
 Camponotus fieldellus Forel, 1910
 Camponotus figaro Collingwood and Yarrow, 1969
 Camponotus flavescens (Fabricius, 1793)
 Camponotus flavicomans Clouse, 2007
 Camponotus flavocassis Donisthorpe, 1941
 Camponotus flavocrines Donisthorpe, 1941
 Camponotus flavomarginatus Mayr, 1862
 Camponotus fletcheri Donisthorpe, 1942
 Camponotus floridanus (Buckley, 1866)
 Camponotus florius Santschi, 1926
 Camponotus foleyi Santschi, 1939
 Camponotus foraminosus Forel, 1879
 Camponotus foreli Emery, 1881
 Camponotus formiciformis Forel, 1885
 Camponotus formosensis Wheeler, 1927
 Camponotus fornasinii Emery, 1895
 Camponotus fragilis Pergande, 1893
 Camponotus friedae Forel, 1912
 Camponotus froggatti Forel, 1902
 Camponotus frontalis Pergande, 1896
 Camponotus fryi Mann, 1916
 Camponotus fugax Forel, 1902
 Camponotus fulvopilosus (De Geer, 1778)
 Camponotus fumidus Roger, 1863
 Camponotus furvus Santschi, 1911
 †Camponotus fuscipennis Carpenter, 1930
 Camponotus fuscivillosus Xiao and Wang, 1989
 Camponotus fuscocinctus Emery, 1888
 Camponotus fuscus Kim and Kim, 1994

G

 Camponotus gabonensis Santschi, 1926
 Camponotus galla Forel, 1894
 Camponotus galoko Rakotonirina, Csösz & Fisher, 2016
 Camponotus gallagheri Collingwood & Agosti, 1996
 Camponotus gambeyi Emery, 1883
 Camponotus geayi Santschi, 1922
 Camponotus genatus Santschi, 1922
 Camponotus gentingensis Dumpert, 1995
 Camponotus geralensis Emery, 1920
 Camponotus gerberti Donisthorpe, 1949
 Camponotus germaini Emery, 1903
 Camponotus gestroi Emery, 1878
 Camponotus gibber Forel, 1891
 Camponotus gibbinotus Forel, 1902
 Camponotus gibbosus Karavaiev, 1929
 Camponotus gilviceps Roger, 1863
 Camponotus gilviventris Roger, 1863
 Camponotus glabrisquamis Emery, 1911
 Camponotus godmani Forel, 1899
 Camponotus goeldii Forel, 1894
 Camponotus gombaki Dumpert, 1986
 Camponotus gouldi Forel, 1886
 Camponotus gouldianus Forel, 1922
 †Camponotus gracilis Zhang, 1989
 Camponotus grandidieri Forel, 1886
 Camponotus greeni Forel, 1911
 Camponotus gretae Forel, 1902
 Camponotus guanchus Santschi, 1908
 Camponotus guayapa Kusnezov, 1952
 Camponotus guidae McArthur, 2007
 Camponotus guizhouensis Wang, 1992
 Camponotus guttatus Emery, 1899

H

 Camponotus habereri Forel, 1911
 Camponotus haematocephalus Emery, 1903
 Camponotus haereticus Santschi, 1914
 Camponotus hagensii Forel, 1886
 Camponotus hannani Forel, 1899
 Camponotus hapi Weber, 1943
 Camponotus haroi Espadaler, 1997
 Camponotus hartogi Forel, 1902
 Camponotus hastifer Emery, 1911
 Camponotus havilandi Arnold, 1922
 Camponotus heathi Mann, 1916
 Camponotus hedwigae Forel, 1912
 Camponotus helleri Emery, 1903
 Camponotus hellmichi Menozzi, 1935
 Camponotus helvus Xiao & Wang, 1989
 Camponotus hemichlaena Yasumatsu & Brown, 1951
 †Camponotus heracleus (Heer, 1849)
 Camponotus herculeanus (Linnaeus, 1758)
 Camponotus hermanni Emery, 1911
 Camponotus heros Santschi, 1926
 Camponotus heteroclitus Forel, 1895
 Camponotus hildebrandti Forel, 1886
 Camponotus himalayanus Forel, 1893
 Camponotus hippocrepis Emery, 1920
 Camponotus hoelldobleri Cagniant, 1991
 Camponotus holosericeus Emery, 1889
 Camponotus holzi Forel, 1921
 Camponotus hoplites Emery, 1914
 Camponotus horni Clark, 1930
 Camponotus horseshoetus Datta & Raychaudhuri, 1985
 Camponotus hospes (Emery, 1884)
 Camponotus hova Forel, 1891
 Camponotus humeralis Emery, 1920
 Camponotus humerus Wang & Wu, 1994
 Camponotus husseini Dietrich, 2004
 Camponotus hyatti Emery, 1893
 Camponotus hypoclineoides Wheeler, 1919

I

 Camponotus icarus Forel, 1912
 Camponotus ignestii Menozzi, 1935
 Camponotus iheringi Forel, 1908
 Camponotus ilgii Forel, 1894
 Camponotus imitator Forel, 1891
 Camponotus immaculatus Forel, 1892
 Camponotus immigrans Santschi, 1914
 Camponotus importunus Forel, 1911
 Camponotus impressilabris Stitz, 1938
 Camponotus improprius (Forel, 1879)
 Camponotus inca Emery, 1903
 Camponotus incensus Wheeler, 1932
 Camponotus inconspicuus Mayr, 1872
 Camponotus indefinitus Karavaiev, 1929
 Camponotus indeflexus (Walker, 1859)
 Camponotus indicatus Santschi, 1922
 †Camponotus induratus (Heer, 1849)
 Camponotus inflatus Lubbock, 1880
 Camponotus innexus Forel, 1902
 Camponotus insipidus Forel, 1893
 Camponotus integellus Forel, 1899
 Camponotus interjectus Mayr, 1877
 Camponotus intrepidus (Kirby W., 1819)
 Camponotus invidus Forel, 1892
 Camponotus ionius Emery, 1920
 Camponotus iridis Santschi, 1922
 Camponotus irritabilis (Smith F., 1857)
 Camponotus irritans (Smith F., 1857)
 Camponotus isabellae Forel, 1909
 Camponotus itoi Forel, 1912

J

 Camponotus jaliensis Dalla Torre, 1893
 Camponotus janeti Forel, 1895
 Camponotus janforrestae McArthur & Shattuck, 2001
 Camponotus janussus Bolton, 1995
 Camponotus japonicus Mayr, 1866
 Camponotus jeanneli Santschi, 1914
 Camponotus jejuensis Kim & Kim, 1986
 Camponotus jianghuaensis Xiao & Wang, 1989
 Camponotus jizani Collingwood, 1985
 Camponotus jodina Rasoamanana, Csösz & Fisher, 2017
 Camponotus johnclarki Taylor, 1992
 Camponotus juliae Emery, 1903
 Camponotus karaha Rasoamanana, Csösz & Fisher, 2017

K

 Camponotus kaguya Terayama, 1999
 Camponotus kattensis Bingham, 1903
 Camponotus kaura Snelling & Torres, 1998
 Camponotus keiferi Wheeler, 1934
 Camponotus keihitoi Forel, 1913
 Camponotus kelleri Forel, 1886
 Camponotus kersteni Gerstacker, 1871
 Camponotus kiesenwetteri (Roger, 1859)
 Camponotus kiusiuensis Santschi, 1937
 Camponotus klaesii (Forel, 1886)
 Camponotus klugii Emery, 1895
 Camponotus knysnae Arnold, 1922
 Camponotus kollbrunneri Forel, 1910
 Camponotus kolthoffi Stitz, 1934
 Camponotus kopetdaghensis Dlussky & Zabelin, 1985
 Camponotus korthalsiae Emery, 1887
 Camponotus koseritzi Emery, 1888
 Camponotus kraepelini Forel, 1901
 Camponotus kurdistanicus Emery, 1898
 Camponotus kutteri Forel, 1915
 Camponotus kutterianus Baroni Urbani, 1972

L

 Camponotus laconicus Emery, 1920
 Camponotus laevigatus (Smith F., 1858)
 Camponotus lamarckii Forel, 1892
 Camponotus lamborni Donisthorpe, 1933
 Camponotus lameerei Emery, 1898
 Camponotus lamosy Rakotonirina & Fisher, 2018
 Camponotus lancifer Emery, 1894
 Camponotus landolti Forel, 1879
 Camponotus langi Wheeler, 1922
 Camponotus largiceps Wu & Wang, 1989
 Camponotus lasiselene Wang & Wu, 1994
 Camponotus latangulus Roger, 1863
 Camponotus latebrosus (Walker, 1859)
 Camponotus lateralis (Olivier, 1792)
 Camponotus laurenti Santschi, 1939
 Camponotus leae Wheeler, 1915
 Camponotus legionarium Santschi, 1911
 Camponotus lenkoi Kempf, 1960
 Camponotus leptocephalus Emery, 1923
 Camponotus lespesii Forel, 1886
 Camponotus lessonai Emery, 1894
 Camponotus leucophaeus (Smith F., 1861)
 Camponotus leveillei Emery, 1895
 Camponotus leydigi Forel, 1886
 Camponotus liandia Rakotonirina & Fisher, 2018
 Camponotus libanicus Andre, 1881
 Camponotus ligeus Donisthorpe, 1931
 Camponotus lighti Wheeler, 1927
 Camponotus ligniperda (Latreille, 1802)
 †Camponotus lignitus (Germar, 1837)
 Camponotus lilianae Forel, 1913
 Camponotus limbiventris Santschi, 1911
 Camponotus lindigi Mayr, 1870
 Camponotus linnaei Forel, 1886
 Camponotus liogaster Santschi, 1932
 Camponotus lividicoxis Viehmeyer, 1925
 Camponotus longiceps (Smith F., 1863)
 Camponotus longicollis Rasoamanana, Csösz & Fisher, 2017
 Camponotus longideclivis McArthur & Adams, 1996
 Camponotus longifacies McArthur, 2003
 Camponotus longipalpis Santschi, 1926
 Camponotus longipilis Emery, 1911
 †Camponotus longiventris Théobald, 1937
 †Camponotus longus Zhang, 1989
 Camponotus loweryi McArthur & Adams, 1996
 Camponotus lownei Forel, 1895
 Camponotus lubbocki Forel, 1886
 Camponotus lucayanus Wheeler, 1905
 Camponotus luctuosus (Smith F., 1858)
 Camponotus luteiventris Emery, 1897
 Camponotus luteus (Smith F., 1858)
 Camponotus lutzi Forel, 1905

M

 Camponotus macareaveyi Taylor, 1992
 Camponotus maccooki Forel, 1879
 Camponotus macilentus Smith F., 1877
 Camponotus mackayensis Forel, 1902
 Camponotus macrochaeta Emery, 1903
 Camponotus macromischoides Fontenla Rizo, 1997
 Camponotus maculatus (Fabricius, 1782)
 Camponotus magister Santschi, 1925
 Camponotus maguassa Wheeler, 1922
 Camponotus mainty Rakotonirina & Fisher, 2018
 Camponotus manabo Rakotonirina & Fisher, 2018
 Camponotus marianensis Clouse, 2007
 Camponotus massiliensis Schmitz, 1950
 Camponotus massinissa Wheeler, 1922
 Camponotus matsilo Rakotonirina, Csösz & Fisher, 2016
 Camponotus maudella Mann, 1921
 Camponotus maxwellensis Forel, 1913
 Camponotus maynei Forel, 1916
 Camponotus mayri Forel, 1879
 Camponotus medeus Emery, 1920
 Camponotus megalonyx Wheeler, 1919
 Camponotus melanocephalus Roger, 1863
 Camponotus melanoticus Emery, 1894
 Camponotus melanus Dumpert, 1995
 Camponotus melichloros Kirby, 1889
 Camponotus melinus MacKay, 1997
 Camponotus mendax Forel, 1895
 †Camponotus mengei Mayr, 1868
 Camponotus micans (Nylander, 1856)
 Camponotus michaelseni Forel, 1907
 Camponotus micragyne Dumpert, 1995
 †Camponotus microcephalus Carpenter, 1930
 Camponotus micrositus Wheeler, 1937
 †Camponotus microthoracus Zhang, 1989
 Camponotus mifaka Rakotonirina, Csösz & Fisher, 2016
 Camponotus mina Forel, 1879
 Camponotus minozzii Emery, 1920
 Camponotus minus Wang & Wu, 1994
 Camponotus mirabilis Emery, 1903
 Camponotus misturus (Smith F., 1857)
 Camponotus mitis (Smith F., 1858)
 Camponotus mocquerysi Emery, 1899
 Camponotus mocsaryi Forel, 1902
 Camponotus moderatus Santschi, 1930
 Camponotus modoc Wheeler, 1910
 Camponotus moelleri Forel, 1912
 Camponotus moeschi Forel, 1910
 Camponotus molossus Forel, 1907
 Camponotus monardi Santschi, 1930
 Camponotus monju Terayama, 1999
 Camponotus montivagus Forel, 1885
 Camponotus morosus (Smith F., 1858)
 Camponotus mozabensis Emery, 1899
 Camponotus mucronatus Emery, 1890
 Camponotus mus Roger, 1863
 Camponotus mussolinii Donisthorpe, 1936
 Camponotus mystaceus Emery, 1886

N

 Camponotus nacerdus Norton, 1868
 Camponotus nadimi Tohme, 1969
 Camponotus naegelii Forel, 1879
 Camponotus namacola Prins, 1973
 Camponotus nasicus Forel, 1891
 Camponotus nasutus Emery, 1895
 Camponotus natalensis (Smith F., 1858)
 Camponotus navigator Wilson & Taylor, 1967
 Camponotus nawai Ito, 1914
 Camponotus nearcticus Emery, 1893
 Camponotus nepos Forel, 1912
 Camponotus nicobarensis Mayr, 1865
 Camponotus nidulans (Smith F., 1860)
 Camponotus nigricans Roger, 1863
 Camponotus nigriceps (Smith F., 1858)
 Camponotus nigripes Dumpert, 1995
 Camponotus nigroaeneus (Smith F., 1858)
 Camponotus nigronitidus Azuma, 1951
 Camponotus nipponensis Santschi, 1937
 Camponotus nirvanae Forel, 1893
 Camponotus nitens Mayr, 1870
 Camponotus nitidior (Santschi, 1921)
 Camponotus niveosetosus Mayr, 1862
 Camponotus normatus Forel, 1899
 Camponotus nosibeensis Andre, 1887
 Camponotus novaeboracensis (Fitch, 1855)
 Camponotus novaehollandiae Mayr, 1870
 Camponotus noveboracensis (Fitch, 1854)
 Camponotus novogranadensis Mayr, 1870
 †Camponotus novotnyi Samsinák, 1967
 Camponotus nutans Mayr, 1867
 Camponotus nylanderi Emery, 1921
 Camponotus nywet Bolton, 1995

O

 Camponotus oasium Forel, 1890
 †Camponotus obesus Piton, 1935
 Camponotus oblongus (Smith, 1858)
 Camponotus obreptivus Forel, 1899
 Camponotus obscuripes Mayr, 1879
 Camponotus obscuriventris Cagniant, 1991
 Camponotus obtritus Emery, 1911
 Camponotus occasus Emery, 1920
 Camponotus ocreatus Emery, 1893
 Camponotus oculatior Santschi, 1935
 Camponotus odiosus Forel, 1886
 †Camponotus oeningensis (Heer, 1849)
 Camponotus oertzeni Forel, 1889
 Camponotus oetkeri Forel, 1910
 Camponotus ogasawarensis Terayama & Satoh, 1990
 Camponotus olivieri Forel, 1886
 Camponotus ominosus Forel, 1911
 Camponotus opaciceps Roger, 1863
 Camponotus opaciventris Mayr, 1879
 Camponotus orinobates Santschi, 1919
 Camponotus orinus Dumpert, 1995
 Camponotus orites Santschi, 1919
 Camponotus orombe Rakotonirina, Csösz & Fisher, 2016
 Camponotus orthocephalus Emery, 1894
 Camponotus orthodoxus Santschi, 1914
 Camponotus ostiarius Forel, 1914
 Camponotus ovaticeps (Spinola, 1851)
 Camponotus overbecki Viehmeyer, 1916
 Camponotus owensae Shattuck & McArthur, 2002
 Camponotus oxleyi Forel, 1902

P

 Camponotus pachylepis Emery, 1920
 †Camponotus palaeopterus (Zhang, 1989)
 Camponotus pallens (Le Guillou, 1842)
 Camponotus pallescens Mayr, 1887
 Camponotus pallidiceps Emery, 1887
 Camponotus palmyrensis Tohme & Tohme, 2000
 Camponotus palpatus Emery, 1897
 Camponotus panamensis Fernandez, 2002
 Camponotus parabarbatus Bharti & Wachkoo, 2014
 Camponotus paradoxus (Mayr, 1866)
 Camponotus parius Emery, 1889
 Camponotus patimae Wheeler, 1942
 Camponotus pavidus (Smith, 1860)
 Camponotus pawseyi McArthur, 2003
 Camponotus peleliuensis Clouse, 2007
 Camponotus pellarius Wheeler, 1914
 Camponotus pellax Santschi, 1919
 †Camponotus penninervis Théobald, 1937
 Camponotus pennsylvanicus (De Geer, 1773)
 Camponotus peperi Forel, 1913
 Camponotus perjurus Shattuck & McArthur, 2002
 Camponotus perrisii Forel, 1886
 Camponotus perroti Forel, 1897
 Camponotus personatus Emery, 1894
 Camponotus peseshus Bolton, 1995
 Camponotus petersii Emery, 1895
 †Camponotus petrifactus Carpenter, 1930
 Camponotus pexus Santschi, 1929
 Camponotus phytophilus Wheeler, 1934
 Camponotus piceatus Norton, 1868
 Camponotus piceus (Leach, 1825)
 Camponotus picipes (Olivier, 1792)
 Camponotus pictipes Forel, 1891
 Camponotus pictostriatus Karavaiev, 1933
 †Camponotus pictus Zhang et al., 1994
 Camponotus pilicornis (Roger, 1859)
 Camponotus pinguiculus (Heer, 1850)
 Camponotus pinguis (Heer, 1850)
 Camponotus pitjantjatarae McArthur, 2003
 Camponotus pittieri Forel, 1899
 Camponotus placidus (Smith, 1858)
 Camponotus planatus Roger, 1863
 Camponotus planitae Santschi, 1929
 Camponotus planus Smith, 1877
 Camponotus platypus Roger, 1863
 Camponotus platytarsus Roger, 1863
 †Camponotus plenus Zhang, 1989
 Camponotus plutus Santschi, 1922
 Camponotus poecilus Emery, 1893
 Camponotus polymorphicus MacKay, Lopez-Castro & Fernandez, 2002
 Camponotus pompeius Forel, 1886
 Camponotus postangulatus Emery, 1911
 Camponotus postcornutus Clark, 1930
 Camponotus posticus Santschi, 1926
 Camponotus postoculatus Forel, 1914
 Camponotus pressipes Emery, 1893
 Camponotus propinquellus Emery, 1920
 Camponotus propinquus Mayr, 1887
 Camponotus prosseri Shattuck & McArthur, 2002
 Camponotus prostans Forel, 1910
 Camponotus prosulcatus Santschi, 1935
 Camponotus pseudoirritans Wu & Wang, 1989
 Camponotus pseudolendus Wu & Wang, 1989
 Camponotus puberulus Emery, 1897
 Camponotus pulchellus Forel, 1894
 Camponotus pullatus Mayr, 1866
 Camponotus pulvinatus Mayr, 1907
 Camponotus punctaticeps (Mayr, 1867)
 Camponotus punctatissimus Forel, 1907
 Camponotus punctatus Forel, 1912
 Camponotus punctiventris Emery, 1920
 Camponotus punctulatus Mayr, 1868
 Camponotus puniceps Donisthorpe, 1942
 Camponotus pupillus Santschi, 1939
 Camponotus putatus Forel, 1892

Q

 Camponotus quadrimaculatus Forel, 1886
 Camponotus quadrinotatus Forel, 1886
 Camponotus quadrisectus (Smith F., 1858)
 Camponotus quercicola Smith M. R., 1954
 Camponotus quinquedentatus Forel, 1910

R

 Camponotus radiatus Forel, 1892
 Camponotus radovae Forel, 1886
 Camponotus raina Rakotonirina & Fisher, 2018
 Camponotus ramulorum Wheeler, 1905
 Camponotus rapax (Fabricius, 1804)
 Camponotus raphaelis Forel, 1899
 Camponotus reaumuri Forel, 1892
 Camponotus rebeccae Forel, 1913
 Camponotus rectangularis Emery, 1890
 Camponotus rectithorax Forel, 1895
 Camponotus reevei Arnold, 1922
 Camponotus reichardti Arnol’di, 1967
 Camponotus reichenspergeri Santschi, 1926
 Camponotus reinaldi Kempf, 1960
 Camponotus renggeri Emery, 1894
 Camponotus repens Forel, 1897
 Camponotus reticulatus Roger, 1863
 Camponotus rhamses Santschi, 1915
 Camponotus riedeli Pisarski, 1971
 Camponotus robecchii Emery, 1892
 Camponotus robertae Santschi, 1926
 Camponotus robustus Roger, 1863
 Camponotus roeseli Forel, 1910
 Camponotus rotumanus Wilson & Taylor, 1967
 Camponotus rotundinodis Santschi, 1935
 Camponotus roubaudi Santschi, 1911
 Camponotus ruber Emery, 1925
 Camponotus rubidus Xiao & Wang, 1989
 Camponotus rubiginosus Mayr, 1876
 Camponotus rubripes (Latreille, 1802)
 Camponotus rubrithorax Forel, 1899
 Camponotus rudis McArthur, 2003
 Camponotus ruficornis Emery, 1895
 Camponotus rufifemur Emery, 1900
 Camponotus rufigaster Menozzi, 1928
 Camponotus rufipes (Fabricius, 1775)
 Camponotus rufoglaucus (Jerdon, 1851)
 Camponotus rufonigrus (Shattuck & McArthur, 2002)
 Camponotus rufus Crawley, 1925
 Camponotus rusticus Santschi, 1916

S

 Camponotus sacchii Emery, 1899
 Camponotus sada Rakotonirina & Fisher, 2018
 Camponotus salvini Forel, 1899
 Camponotus samius Forel, 1889
 Camponotus sanctaefidei Dalla Torre, 1892
 Camponotus sanctus Forel, 1904
 Camponotus sankisianus Forel, 1913
 Camponotus sannini Tohme & Tohme, 1999
 Camponotus sansabeanus (Buckley, 1866)
 Camponotus santosi Forel, 1908
 Camponotus satan Wheeler, 1919
 Camponotus saussurei Forel, 1879
 Camponotus saxatilis Ruzsky, 1895
 Camponotus sayi Emery, 1893
 Camponotus scabrinodis Arnold, 1924
 Camponotus scalaris Forel, 1901
 Camponotus schaefferi Wheeler, 1909
 Camponotus schneei Mayr, 1903
 Camponotus schoutedeni Forel, 1911
 Camponotus scipio Forel, 1908
 Camponotus scissus Mayr, 1887
 Camponotus scotti McArthur, 2003
 Camponotus scratius Forel, 1907
 Camponotus sculptor Santschi, 1920
 Camponotus sedulus (Smith F., 1857)
 Camponotus selene (Emery, 1889)
 Camponotus selidorsatus Prins, 1973
 Camponotus semirufus Emery, 1925
 Camponotus semitestaceus Snelling, 1970
 Camponotus semoni Forel, 1905
 Camponotus senex (Smith F., 1858)
 Camponotus sericatus Mayr, 1887
 Camponotus sericeiventris (Guerin-Meneville, 1838)
 Camponotus sericeus (Fabricius, 1798)
 Camponotus serotinus Cagniant, 1996
 Camponotus sesquipedalis Roger, 1863
 Camponotus setitibia Forel, 1901
 Camponotus setosus (Shattuck & McArthur, 2002)
 Camponotus seurati Emery, 1920
 Camponotus sexguttatus (Fabricius, 1793)
 Camponotus sexpuctatus Forel, 1894
 †Camponotus shanwangensis Hong, 1984
 Camponotus shaqualavensis Pisarski, 1971
 Camponotus sibreei Forel, 1891
 Camponotus sicheli Mayr, 1866
 Camponotus siemsseni Forel, 1901
 Camponotus sikorai Emery, 1920
 Camponotus silvestrii Emery, 1906
 Camponotus silvicola Forel, 1902
 Camponotus simillimus (Smith F., 1862)
 Camponotus simoni Emery, 1893
 Camponotus simpsoni McArthur, 2003
 Camponotus simulans Forel, 1910
 Camponotus simulator Forel, 1915
 Camponotus simus Emery, 1908
 Camponotus singularis (Smith F., 1858)
 Camponotus sklarus Bolton, 1995
 Camponotus snellingi Bolton, 1995
 Camponotus socius Roger, 1863
 Camponotus socorroensis Wheeler, 1934
 Camponotus socrates Forel, 1904
 Camponotus solon Forel, 1886
 Camponotus somalinus Andre, 1887
 Camponotus spanis Xiao & Wang, 1989
 Camponotus spenceri Clark, 1930
 Camponotus sphaericus Roger, 1863
 Camponotus sphenocephalus Emery, 1911
 Camponotus sphenoidalis Mayr, 1870
 Camponotus spinitarsus Emery, 1920
 Camponotus spinolae Roger, 1863
 Camponotus spissinodis Forel, 1909
 Camponotus sponsorum Forel, 1910
 Camponotus staryi Pisarski, 1971
 Camponotus storeatus Forel, 1910
 Camponotus strangulatus Santschi, 1911
 Camponotus striatipes Dumpert, 1995
 Camponotus striatus (Smith F., 1862)
 Camponotus subbarbatus Emery, 1893
 Camponotus subcircularis Emery, 1920
 Camponotus subnitidus Mayr, 1876
 Camponotus substitutus Emery, 1894
 Camponotus subtilis (Smith F., 1860)
 Camponotus subtruncatus Borgmeier, 1929
 Camponotus sucki Forel, 1901
 Camponotus suffusus (Smith F., 1858)
 Camponotus sylvaticus (Olivier, 1792)

T

 Camponotus tahatensis Santschi, 1929
 Camponotus tafo Rakotonirina, Csösz & Fisher, 2016
 Camponotus taino Snelling & Torres, 1998
 Camponotus taipingensis Forel, 1913
 Camponotus tameri Bolton, 1995
 Camponotus tanosy Rakotonirina & Fisher, 2018
 Camponotus tashcumiri Tarbinsky, 1976
 Camponotus tasmani Forel, 1902
 Camponotus tauricollis Forel, 1894
 Camponotus tenuipes (Smith F., 1857)
 Camponotus tenuiscapus Roger, 1863
 Camponotus tepicanus Pergande, 1896
 Camponotus terbimaculatus Emery, 1920
 Camponotus terebrans (Lowne, 1865)
 Camponotus tergestinus Muller, 1921
 Camponotus terricola Karavaiev, 1929
 Camponotus territus Santschi, 1939
 Camponotus testaceus Emery, 1894
 Camponotus texanus Wheeler, 1903
 Camponotus texens Dumpert, 1986
 Camponotus textor Forel, 1899
 Camponotus thales Forel, 1910
 †Camponotus theobaldi Özdikmen, 2010
 Camponotus thomasseti Forel, 1912
 Camponotus thoracicus (Fabricius, 1804)
 Camponotus thraso Forel, 1893
 Camponotus thysanopus Wheeler, 1937
 Camponotus tilhoi Santschi, 1926
 Camponotus timidus (Jerdon, 1851)
 †Camponotus tokunagai Naora, 1933
 Camponotus tonduzi Forel, 1899
 Camponotus tonkinus Santschi, 1925
 Camponotus torrei Aguayo, 1932
 Camponotus tortuganus Emery, 1895
 Camponotus toussainti Wheeler & Mann, 1914
 Camponotus traegaordhi Santschi, 1914
 Camponotus traili Mayr, 1878
 Camponotus transvaalensis Arnold, 1948
 Camponotus trapeziceps Forel, 1908
 Camponotus trapezoideus Mayr, 1870
 Camponotus tratra Rakotonirina, Csösz & Fisher, 2016
 Camponotus trepidulus Creighton, 1965
 Camponotus tricoloratus Clark, 1941
 Camponotus trietericus Menozzi, 1926
 Camponotus trifasciatus Santschi, 1926
 Camponotus tripartitus Mayr, 1887
 Camponotus tristis Clark, 1930
 Camponotus tritschleri Forel, 1912
 Camponotus truebi Forel, 1910
 Camponotus tumidus Crawley, 1922
 Camponotus turkestanicus Emery, 1887
 Camponotus turkestanus Andre, 1882

U

 Camponotus ulcerosus Wheeler, 1910
 Camponotus ulei Forel, 1904
 †Camponotus ullrichi Bachmayer, 1960
 Camponotus ulvarum Forel, 1899
 Camponotus universitatis Forel, 1890
 Camponotus urichi Forel, 1899
 Camponotus ursus Forel, 1886
 Camponotus ustus Forel, 1879

V

 Camponotus vafer Wheeler, 1910
 Camponotus vagulus Forel, 1908
 Camponotus vagus (Scopoli, 1763)
 Camponotus valdeziae Forel, 1879
 Camponotus vanispinus Xia & Zheng, 1997
 Camponotus varatra Rakotonirina, Csösz & Fisher, 2016
 Camponotus varians Roger, 1863
 Camponotus variegatus (Smith F., 1858)
 Camponotus varius Donisthorpe, 1943
 Camponotus varus Forel, 1910
 †Camponotus vehemens  Förster, 1891
 Camponotus velox (Jerdon, 1851)
 Camponotus versicolor Clark, 1930
 Camponotus vespertinus Arnold, 1960
 Camponotus vestitus (Smith F., 1858)
 †Camponotus vetus Scudder, 1877
 Camponotus vicinus Mayr, 1870
 Camponotus victoriae Arnold, 1959
 Camponotus viehmeyeri Forel, 1911
 Camponotus vigilans (Smith F., 1858)
 Camponotus vinosus (Smith F., 1858)
 Camponotus viri Santschi, 1915
 Camponotus virulens (Smith F., 1861)
 Camponotus vitiosus Smith F., 1874
 Camponotus vittatus Forel, 1904
 Camponotus vividus (Smith F., 1858)
 Camponotus voeltzkowii Forel, 1894
 Camponotus vogti Forel, 1906
 Camponotus vulpusSantschi, 1926

W

 Camponotus walkeri Forel, 1893
 Camponotus wanangus Klimes & McArthur, 2014
 Camponotus wasmanni Emery, 1893
 Camponotus weberi Wheeler, 1935
 Camponotus wedda Forel, 1908
 Camponotus weismanni Forel, 1901
 Camponotus wellmani Forel, 1909
 Camponotus werthi Forel, 1908
 Camponotus westermanni Mayr, 1862
 Camponotus wheeleri Mann, 1916
 Camponotus whitei Wheeler, 1915
 Camponotus wiederkehri Forel, 1894
 Camponotus wolfi Emery, 1920
 Camponotus woodroffeensis McArthur, 2008
 Camponotus wroughtonii Forel, 1893
 Camponotus wytsmani Emery, 1920

X

 Camponotus xanthogaster Santschi, 1925
 Camponotus xanthopilus Shattuck, 2005
 Camponotus xerxes Forel, 1904
 Camponotus xingdoushanensis Wang & Chen, 2003

Y

 Camponotus yala Kusnezov, 1952
 Camponotus yamaokai Terayama and Satoh, 1990
 Camponotus yambaru Terayama, 1999
 Camponotus yessensis Yasumatsu and Brown, 1951
 Camponotus yiningensis Wang and wu, 1994
 Camponotus yogi Wheeler, 1915

Z

 Camponotus zavo Rakotonirina, Csösz & Fisher, 2016
 Camponotus zenon Forel, 1912
 Camponotus zimmermanni Forel, 1894
 Camponotus zoc'' Forel, 1879

References

 World Ants (valid extant species) - Kinds of FormicidaeCamponotus

 List
Camponotus